Lilieta Maumau is a New Zealand international rugby league player. She made her debut in the 2014 Test Match against the Australia. Maumau participated in the 2016 NRL Auckland Nines She represented the Kiwi Ferns at the 2017 Women's Rugby League World Cup.

References

1992 births
Living people
New Zealand female rugby league players
New Zealand women's national rugby league team players